Al Jufra Airbase  is a Libyan Air Force base in Waddan,  northeast of Hun, a desert city in the Jufra District of Libya. It was originally used by the Libyan Arab Air Force from 1969 to 2011.

The runway length does not include  paved overruns on each end.

History 
 
Prior to the First Libyan Civil War, during the 1980s, the No. 1025 Squadron operated Mig-25PDs at the Al Jufra-Hun Airbase for defense of the north coast. TU-22, G.222, and An-26 were based at Jufra, parked on open pavement, sand berm shielded pads, and in aircraft shelters. Considering the positioning of many of the aircraft visible in the satellite imagery, and what is known of the maintenance record of the Libyan Air Force, the operational inventory of combat aircraft based at Jufra in 2011 can be assumed to be quite low. The G.222 is believed to have not flown for more than a decade.

No-Fly Zone enforcement
The airbase was bombed on 24 March 2011 by French aircraft, in accordance with the UN-backed enforcement of the No-Fly Zone over Libya. Over two and a half months later, on 13 June, the area was again struck by NATO forces.

See also
Transport in Libya
List of airports in Libya

References

External links
OpenStreetMap - Al Jufra Air Base
OurAirports - Al Jufrah Airport

Airports in Libya
Military installations of Libya
Libyan Air Force bases